Tina Rosenberg (born April 14, 1960) is an American journalist and the author of three books. For one of them, The Haunted Land: Facing Europe's Ghosts After Communism (1995), she won the Pulitzer Prize for General Non-Fiction and the National Book Award for Nonfiction.

Rosenberg was born in Brooklyn, New York. She is a longtime New York Times writer and, since 2010, co-author of the New York Times "Fixes" column.  The column, written with David Bornstein, is an example of solutions journalism — rigorous reporting on how people are responding to problems. Bornstein, Rosenberg and Courtney Martin founded the Solutions Journalism Network in 2013. The organization works with news organizations to help them add solutions reporting to their coverage.

She grew up in Holt, Michigan, and earned her bachelor's and master's degrees from Northwestern University. She was living in Latin America in 1987 she won a MacArthur Fellowship.  Her experiences there led to her first published book, Children of Cain: Violence and the Violent in Latin America (1991).

Rosenberg has also written hundreds of magazine articles, for such publications as The New Yorker, Foreign Policy, Rolling Stone, The New Republic, and The Washington Post.

Between 1997 and 2007 she was an editorial writer for The New York Times, specializing in international issues. She has also been a contributing editor at The New York Times Magazine.

Her latest book is Join the Club: How Peer Pressure Can Transform the World (2011).

Books

 Children of Cain: Violence and the Violent in Latin America (Random House, 1991)
 The Haunted Land: Facing Europe's Ghosts After Communism (Random House, 1996)
 Join the Club: How Peer Pressure Can Transform the World (W.W. Norton, 2011)

References

External links
 Columbia University World Leaders Forum: Tina Rosenberg
 Pulitzer.org: Tina Rosenberg
 Posts by Tina Rosenberg in The New York Times' Opinion Pages
 
 

1960 births
People from Brooklyn
Northwestern University School of Communication alumni
Living people
Jewish American writers
National Book Award winners
MacArthur Fellows
Pulitzer Prize for General Non-Fiction winners
The New York Times writers
The New Yorker people
The Washington Post people
20th-century American writers
21st-century American non-fiction writers
20th-century American women writers
21st-century American women writers
American women journalists
Jewish women writers
20th-century American journalists
21st-century American Jews
People from Holt, Michigan